Bifrost or Bifröst is a bridge in Norse mythology.

Bifrost may also refer to:

Arts and entertainment
 Bifrost (band), a Danish "flower power" rock band of the '70s and '80s
 Bifrost (magazine), a French science fiction magazine
 Bifrost (role-playing game), a role-playing game

Computing
 Bifrost (Trojan horse), Windows malware
 Bifrost (microarchitecture), microarchitecture for GPU by ARM
 Bifröst, a meta-circular evaluator in OpenJDK part of the Valhalla OpenJDK Project

Places
 Rural Municipality of Bifrost, Manitoba, Canada
 Bifröst (town), a small town in Iceland
 Bifröst University, in Bifröst, Iceland
 Bifrost Ledge, Victoria Land, Antarctica

Other uses
 Åsatrufellesskapet Bifrost, a Norwegian association for modern Asatru

See also
 Biofrost, Chinese-Canadian League of Legends player
 Bitfrost,  the security design specification for the  One Laptop per Child XO computer, a low cost laptop intended for children in developing countries. The specification itself mentions that the name "Bitfrost" is a play on the Norse mythology concept of Bifröst.